The Peirce Mansion is a 23-room mansion located in Sioux City, Iowa. From 1960 until 2011, the mansion was home to the Sioux City Public Museum with exhibits relating to the history of the region. It is still owned by the Sioux City Public Museum and has now been restored to a Victorian-era appearance. It is open to the public for quarterly open house events and is available for rental.

The mansion was listed on the National Register of Historic Places in 1978.

History
The mansion was built for financier John Peirce, who built the Romanesque home out of Sioux Quartzite with 23 rooms in 1893.

First purchased by a group called the Junior League in 1959, the opening of the mansion as a museum was in September 1960. There was a robbery of a saddlebag from the museum in 1996 that was part of a string of museum thefts which involved stealing Native American artifacts.

A new museum location was opened in 2011 in Sioux City's downtown at a former J. C. Penney store.

References

External links

 Peirce Mansion - Sioux City Museum

Houses completed in 1893
Houses on the National Register of Historic Places in Iowa
National Register of Historic Places in Sioux City, Iowa
Museums in Woodbury County, Iowa
Romanesque Revival architecture in Iowa
Buildings and structures in Sioux City, Iowa
Historic house museums in Iowa
Houses in Sioux City, Iowa
Tourist attractions in Sioux City, Iowa
1893 establishments in Iowa
Gilded Age mansions